Ebenezer Ackahbi (born 30 September 2003) is a Ghanaian professional footballer who plays as midfielder for Ghana Premier League side Medeama S.C.

Career

Early career 
Ackahbi started his career with Tarkwa-based Ghana Division Two League side Archisu football club.

Medeama SC 
In February 2018, he signed for  Tarkwa-based side Medeama SC on a long-term deal. On 28 February 2018, he was unveiled along with 10 other players including Bright Enchil, Ali Ouattara and Richard Boadu as the new signings for the Medeama SC ahead of the 2018 Ghana Premier League. He made his debut on 29 December 2019, playing 62 minute and later coming off for Nana Kofi Babil in a 3–1 victory over Cape Coast Ebusua Dwarfs.

During the 2019–20 Ghana Premier League season, he played in all 15 league matches before the league was cancelled as a result of the COVID-19 pandemic.

References

External links 

 

Living people
2003 births
Association football midfielders
Ghanaian footballers
Ghana Premier League players
Medeama SC players